Ludwik Czachowski (5 May 1944 – 10 July 1999), was a Polish ice hockey player. He played for TKH Toruń during his career. He also played for the Polish national team at the 1972 Winter Olympics and several World Championships.

References

External links
 

1944 births
1999 deaths
Ice hockey players at the 1972 Winter Olympics
TKH Toruń players
Olympic ice hockey players of Poland
Polish ice hockey defencemen
Sportspeople from Toruń